Vladimir Cruz Marrero (born 26 July 1965) is a Cuban actor, screenwriter, playwright, film and theatre director. He is perhaps best known for his role in the film Strawberry and Chocolate (1994).

Career
Cruz made his acting debut on the stage as an amateur actor in 1981. He then began to study at the Instituto Superior de Arte in 1983 and graduated in 1988 with a licentiate degree in performing arts.

He became well-known for his supporting role in the film Strawberry and Chocolate (1994), which received a nomination for the Academy Award for Best Foreign Language Film and many awards.

He also wrote plays and screenplays as well as directing plays and films, notably Afinidades (2010).

He has an extensive career in film, theater and television. He has recently appeared in the film Los buenos demonios (2018) and the television series Narcos: Mexico (2018), the former of which earned him the Silver Biznaga for Best Supporting Actor at the Málaga Spanish Film Festival.

Filmography

Director
2005: ¿Soy yo acaso el guardián de mi hermano?
2010: Afinidades (co-directed with Jorge Perugorría)

Screenwriter
2005: ¿Soy yo acaso el guardián de mi hermano?
2010: Afinidades

Actor
1987: Capablanca
1987: Hoy como ayer
1990: La botija (1 episode - "Teo joven") (TV series)
1994: Fresa y chocolate a.k.a. Strawberry and Chocolate as David
1995: ¡Ay, Señor, Señor! (1 episode - "Cuestión de huevos") (TV series)
1996: Turno de oficio: Diez años después (2 episodes as Javier -- "Cabos atados", parts 1 and 2) (TV series)
1997: Cuba libre - velocipedi ai tropici as Carlos
1997: La deuda as Hildebrando Cardona, the groom
1997: Little Tropikana
1998: La rumbera
1998: La noche por delante (1 episode) (TV series)
1998: A las once en casa (1 episode as Fidel in "De mal en peor") (TV series)
2000: Un paraíso bajo las estrellas as Sergito
2000: The Waiting List as Emilio
2000: El comisario (1 episode—24 Horas") (TV series)
2001: Policías, en el corazón de la calle as Samuel Noriega (8 episodes) (TV series)
2003: De colores (TV movie)
2003: Viva Sapato! as Carlos
2003: Arcibel's Game as Arata
2004: Aquí no hay quien viva as Samuel (1 episode - "Érase un matrimonio de conveniencia") (TV series)
2005: ...al fin, el mar as Pablo
2005: ¿Soy yo acaso el guardián de mi hermano?
2006: The Wooden Box as Jorge
2006: La dársena de poniente as Martín (13 episodes) (TV series)
2008: Che -- as Ramiro Valdés Menéndez in Part One
2008: La mala as Chucho
2008: Horn of Plenty as Jacinto
2010: Afinidades2011: Las razones del corazón as Nicolás
2012: 7 días en La Habana (post-production)
2014: La ignorancia de la sangreShorts
1999: Muertesita, una historia de amor as Vincent (short)
2004: Marco línea perdida (short)
2005: Civilizados (short)
2010: La ventaja del Sicario as Sicario (short)

Theatre

Actor
1986: S.O.S, una situación terriblemente delicada, written by Jan Solovic and directed by Maria Elena Ortega
1988: El Alma buena de Tsé Chuang, written by Bertolt Brecht and directed by Maria Elena Ortega
1989: Accidente, written by Roberto Orihuela and directed by Carlos Pérez Peña.
1990: Tu parte de Culpa, written by Senel Paz and directed by Carlos Pérez Peña
1990: Calle Cuba nª 80 bajo la lluvia, written by Rafael González and directed by Carlos Pérez Peña
1991: Contar y Cantar, written by Onelio Jorge Cardoso and directed by Sergio González
1991: Fabriles, written by Reinaldo Montero and directed by Carlos Pérez Peña
1993: Asudiansam, written and directed by Ricardo Muñoz Caravaca
1994: A la vuela, vuela... año 1900 tanto, written and directed by Ricardo Muñoz Caravaca
1995: No le digas que la quieres, written by Senel Paz and directed by Vladimir Cruz
1995: El espejo en el espejo, written by Michael Ende and directed by Vladimir Cruz
1996: Fresa y Chocolate (I), written by Senel Paz and directed by Hugo Medrano
1998: Fresa y Chocolate (II), written by Senel Paz and directed by Carlos Díaz
2000: Hoy no puedo ir a trabajar porque estoy enamorado, written by Iñigo Ramírez de Haro and directed by Natalia Menéndez
2001: La Historia del Soldado, written by Stravinski-Ramuz and directed by José Luis García Sánchez
2003: El sueño de una noche de verano, written by William Shakespeare, directed by Miguel Narros
2004: Tirano banderas, written by Valle-Inclán and directed by Nieves Gámez
2006: Huis clos (sin salida), written by Jean-Paul Sartre, directed by Tony Suárez
2007: La divina filotea (auto sacramental), written by Calderón de la Barca, directed by Pedro Mari Sánchez
2009: Don Juan Tenorio, written by José Zorrilla, directed by Jesús Prieto
2009: Fuenteovejuna, written by Lope de Vega, directed by Liuba Cid

Awards
Wins
1994: Won Golden Kikito for category "Best actor" at Gramado Film Festival for his role as David in Fresa y chocolate (joint award with Jorge Perugorría)
1994: Won UNEAC Award of "Best actor in a film" by Unión Nacional de Escritores y Artistas de Cuba
1994: Won Panambí Award as "best actor" at the Festival de Asunción (Paraguay)
1995: Won for category "Cinema - Best Supporting Actor" at Premios ACE for his role in Fresa y chocolate as David
2009: Won Special Jury Award for his role in Horn of Plenty as Jacinto at Mar del Plata Film Festival (joint with 8 other cast members)
Nominations
2008: Nominated for category "Supporting Performance, Male" at the Spanish Actors Union Awards

References

External links

1965 births
Living people
People from Placetas
Cuban male film actors
Cuban male stage actors
20th-century Cuban male actors
21st-century Cuban male actors
Instituto Superior de Arte alumni